The North Carolina Department of Public Safety (NCDPS) is an umbrella agency that carries out many of the state's law enforcement, emergency response and homeland security functions. The department was created in 1977 as the Department of Crime Control and Public Safety. In 2012, the North Carolina Department of Correction and the North Carolina Department of Juvenile Justice and Delinquency Prevention were merged with Crime Control & Public Safety to create the new agency.

The department is headed by a secretary of public safety, who is appointed by the governor of North Carolina. The secretary is a member of the North Carolina Cabinet. The most recent Secretary Erik Hooks resigned in August, 2021.

Sections 

The Department of Public Safety is broken into sections that cover a wide range of regulatory and law enforcement tasks.

Juvenile facilities
The juvenile section has the following juvenile long-term commitment facilities, called "youth development centers":
Stonewall Jackson Youth Development Center near Concord - Serves boys
C. A. Dillon Youth Development Center in Butner - Serves boys
Chatham Youth Development Center in the Central Carolina Business Park in Siler City - Houses girls and boys - Opened in 2008
Dobbs Youth Development Center - Near Kinston - Serves boys, opened in 1944

Secretaries
J. Phil Carlton, April 1977 to December 1978
Herbert L. Hyde, Jan. 1979 to August 1979
Burley B. Mitchell, August 1979 to January 1982
Heman R. Clark, Feb. 1982 to January 1985
Joseph W. Dean, January 1985 to May 1992
Alan V. Pugh, June 1992 to January 1993
Thurman B. Hampton, February 1993 to September 1995
Richard H. Moore, December 1995 to November 1999
David E. Kelly, November 1999 to January 2001
Bryan E. Beatty, January 2001 to January 2009
Reuben F. Young, January 2009 - January 2013 (Secretary of Crime Control & Public Safety until 1 Jan. 2012; Secretary of Public Safety thereafter)
Kieran Shanahan, January 2013 - July 2013
Frank L. Perry, August 2013 – December 2016
Erik Hooks, January 2017 – August 2021
Eddie Buffaloe, September 2021 – present

Controversy

Over the recommendations of the prison staff, a private maintenance contract with the Keith Corporation and the manner in which the contract was renewed resulted in an FBI investigation as reported by the News & Observer.

At the prison located in Tabor City, NC, as reported by WECT in February 2014, the new administrator was accused of forcing employees to pay the new administrator for promotions through an administrator-designed "fundraising" campaign. According to WECT, "still, an October e-mail sent by Prison Administrator Patsy Chavis to staff reads, "We cannot require anyone to pay...however supervisors need to be encouraged to participate... Please let me know if you encounter any resistance or unwillingness to pay.". After an internal investigation lasting only a few weeks, the state found no "wrongdoing" in the fundraising effort but halted the program until "state prison administrators and auditors can develop formal policy guidelines for employee fundraising activities.".

Another issue at the same prison, in February 2014, was the death of a 39-year-old inmate, in which an autopsy was needed to determine the cause of death. The cause of death was reported as having been natural causes, however, a WECT report dated July 30, 2015 revealed that the cause of death was "methanol toxicity" from a concoction of chemical including hand sanitizer that the inmate drank. According to the same news report, the department of public safety conducted an investigation, "but the results aren't public record."

In June 2017, the Charlotte Observer launched a series of articles that found a hidden world of drugs, sex, and gang violence – much of it fueled by employees within the prison system. As a result of these articles, the North Carolina General Assembly has directed state prison leaders to turn over information about contraband, hiring practices, and employee misconduct. Another article covered how tax dollars were used to fund drugs, cell phones, and abuse in the prison system. An additional story found that the "staff shortages in North Carolina's prisons have climbed to dangerous levels over the past two years."

The News & Observer of Raleigh reported that the 5 deaths of officers in 2017 may have been prevented by better staffing.

After its review, the Joint Legislative Oversight Committee on Justice and Public Safety could make recommendations to the full legislature before it convenes for the 2018 session in May 2018.

WBTV reported that a prison employee stated that prison administrators have taken steps to manipulate the numbers in an attempt to cover the deep extent of the staffing shortage. Another report by the same station stated that safety audit teams routinely overlook safety problems to benefit their friends. "You and I both know that when I go to your facility or when you go to my facility to look at security issues, we sort of take a cursory glance because we don't want to hurt our buddies' feelings at another facility,

References

News & Observer: Crime Control as a launching pad?
News & Observer: What does the Crime Control Secretary do?

External links

Public Safety
Public Safety
Organizations based in Raleigh, North Carolina
1977 establishments in North Carolina